Phillip M. DeLaine is a former member of the Ohio House of Representatives.

References

1920s births
Democratic Party members of the Ohio House of Representatives
Possibly living people